The 2015 South Korean Figure Skating Championships was the South Korean Figure Skating Championships for the 2014–2015 season. It was the 69th edition of those championships held. It was organized by the Korean Skating Union.

Skaters competed in the disciplines of men's and ladies' singles on the senior, junior levels and ice dancing on the junior levels for the title of national champion of South Korea. (Skaters in Novice Levels competed at Novice Championship in December 2014) The results of the national championships were used to choose the Korean teams to the 2015 World Figure Skating Championships.

The competition was held between 7 and 9 January 2015 at the Mokdong Ice Rink in Seoul.

Senior results

Senior men

Senior ladies

Junior results

Junior men

Junior ladies

Junior ice dance

International team selections

World Championships
The team to the 2015 World Championships was announced as follows:

Four Continents Championships
The team to the 2015 Four Continents Championships was announced as follows:

World Junior Championships
The team to the 2015 World Junior Championships was announced as follows:

External links
2015 South Korean Figure Skating Championships 
 Day 1 Results (Part 1): Junior Ladies SP
 Day 1 Results (Part 2): Senior Men SP, Junior Men SP
 Day 2 Results: Senior Ladies SP, Junior Men FS, Junior Ladies FS
 Day 3 Results: Senior Men FS, Senior Ladies FS, Dance Junior FD

South Korean Figure Skating Championships
South Korean Figure Skating Championships, 2015
Figure skating
January 2015 sports events in South Korea